The Lavender Labyrinth is a 3-acre large garden about 1.5 miles south of Silver Lake in Shelby, Michigan and minutes away from the shores of Lake Michigan. It is located at Cherry Point Farm & Market, which is owned by Barbara Bull. Cherry Point Farm, opened in 1961, is the oldest farm market in Oceana County.

Farm background
The Bull family has been operating the 600-acre farm since 1949, opening a fruit market shortly after its inception. Barbara Bull is the fourth generation of her family to maintain the land and the garden. As a young girl, Bull sold cherries and pies. When she was 50, she initiated renovations. Renovation plans in 2001 included a new herb garden, greenhouses, a vineyard, a winery, and a renovated barn to act as a guest house. Bull is also a member of the Great Lakes Energy Cooperative.

Design
The labyrinth was designed in 2001 by Bull and Conrad Heiderer, a landscape architect. The asymmetrical labyrinth integrates elements of time within its structure; one stone at the center represents the year, 12 interlocking circles represent the months in a year, 52 vertical posts on the arbor represent the weeks, and 7 cross pieces represent the days of the week. The circles in the labyrinth are seen to represent creation, due to the quality of having no beginning and no end. The flower-shaped design has allusions to the flower of life, which has interlocking circles surrounding one in the center. The labyrinth designed by Heiderer is considered to be a contemporary design.

The path to the stone circle center, which is the herb garden, is surrounded by a rock wall, earthy grounds, and plants—primarily lavender. It takes about an hour to reach the center of the labyrinth. The herb garden is filled with 150 types of herbs.

Lavender
The lavender surrounding the labyrinth is planted in the spring, and it reaches its full bloom in mid-July through late-July. Then, the lavender is collected and dried in late fall and sold in markets. Lavender was specifically chosen because of its aromatherapy effects; it has been documented to include mood and emotional control. It is also at the center of studies that aim to show the relationship between lavender aromatherapy and medical issues, such as coronary circulation.

Visitors and popularity
The lavender labyrinth is open and public for visitors. It is a popular attraction in Michigan. Many other labyrinths exist across the United States, such one in Monroe, Oregon.

References 

Mazes